The Junior ABA League Ideal Starting Five, also known as the All-Junior ABA League Team, is an honor which is given to the best five players of a given Junior ABA League season.

Teams

See also
Junior ABA League MVP

References

U19 ABA League Championship